Zirbel is a surname. Notable people with the surname include:

 Frank Joseph Zirbel (born 1947), American musician, composer, filmmaker and artist
 Tom Zirbel (born 1978), American cyclist

See also
 Zirbes